The 1976 Australian Drivers' Championship was a CAMS sanctioned Australian motor racing title open to racing cars complying with either Australian Formula 1 or Australian Formula 2. It was the 20th Australian Drivers' Championship. The championship winner, John Leffler, was awarded the 1976 CAMS Gold Star.

Calendar

The championship was contested over a four-round series.

Points system
Championship points were awarded on a 9–6–4–3–2–1 basis to the first six place-getters at each round.
For Round 3 only, round placings were determined by allocating points to the first fourteen place-getters in each heat on a 20–16–13–11–10–9–8–7–6–5–4–3–2–1 basis.
Championship points were then awarded on the standard 9–6–4–3–2–1 basis to the top six drivers for that round.
Only holders of current and valid full General Competition Licenses issued by CAMS were eligible for the championship.

Results

Note:
 There were only five classified finishers at the Sandown Park round.
 Vern Schuppan (Elfin MR8 Chevrolet) placed second at the Sandown Park round but was not eligible to score championship points.

Championship name
The championship has been referred to by various names including the 1976 Australian Formula 1 Championship, the 1976 Gold Star Championship, and the 1976 Australian Drivers' Championship. The latter term is used by CAMS in historical records and has been used in this article.

References

Australian Drivers' Championship
Drivers' Championship
Australian Formula 1